A snakebite is an alcoholic drink from the United Kingdom. Traditionally, it is made with equal parts lager and cider. If a dash of blackcurrant cordial is added, it is known as a "snakebite & black" or a "diesel". Different regional recipes and names exist.  It was first popularized in the UK in the 1980s.

Stout may be used instead of lager in the United States.

Availability in the UK
A snakebite is typically served in a pint glass. Serving a snakebite from separate cider and lager taps or bottles is legal in the UK, despite sources that suggest otherwise. In 2001, former US President Bill Clinton was refused a snakebite when he ordered one at the Old Bell Tavern in Harrogate, North Yorkshire, with pub manager Jamie Allen incorrectly saying "It's illegal to serve it here in the UK."

See also 

 Queen Mary (beer cocktail)
Shandy

References

Cocktails with beer

de:Apfelschaumwein#Mischgetränke